Water Resources Development Act (WRDA), is a reference to public laws enacted by Congress to deal with various aspects of water resources:  environmental, structural, navigational, flood protection, hydrology, etc.

Typically, the United States Army Corps of Engineers administers the bulk of the Act's requirements.

There have been a series of WRDAs:

 Water Resources Development Act of 1974, WRDA 1974, 
 Water Resources Development Act of 1976, WRDA 1976, 
 Water Resources Development Act of 1986, WRDA 1986,  (WRDA86.pdf, via TaxPayer.net)
 Water Resources Development Act of 1988, WRDA 1988, 
 Water Resources Development Act of 1990, WRDA 1990, 
 Water Resources Development Act of 1992, WRDA 1992, 
 Water Resources Development Act of 1996, WRDA 1996, 
 Water Resources Development Act of 1999, WRDA 1999, 
 Water Resources Development Act of 2000, WRDA 2000, 
 Water Resources Development Act of 2007, WRDA 2007, 
 Water Resources Development Act of 2014, WRDA 2014, 
 Water Resources Development Act of 2016, WRDA 2016, included as part of the Water Infrastructure Improvements for the Nation Act (WIIN Act), 
 Water Resources Development Act of 2022, WRDA 2022, included as part of the James M. Inhofe National Defense Authorization Act for Fiscal Year 2023 (NDAA 2023).

Related acts 

 River and Harbor Act of 1938, June 20, 1938
 Flood Control Act of 1938, June 28, 1938
 River and Harbor Act of 1940, October 17, 1940
 Flood Control Act of 1941, August 18, 1941
 Flood Control Act of 1944, December 22, 1944
 River and Harbor Act of 1945, March 2, 1945
 River and Harbor Act of 1946, July 24, 1946
 Flood Control Act of 1946, July 24, 1946
 River and Harbor Act of 1948, June 30, 1948 (Flood Control Act of 1948)
 River and Harbor Act of 1950, May 17, 1950 (Flood Control Act of 1950)
 River and Harbor Act of 1954, September 3, 1954 (Flood Control Act of 1954)
 River and Harbor Act of 1958, July 3, 1958 (Flood Control Act of 1958)
 River and Harbor Act of 1960, July 14, 1960 (Flood Control Act of 1960)
 River and Harbor Act of 1962, October 23, 1962 (Flood Control Act of 1962)
 River and Harbor Act of 1965, October 27, 1965 (Flood Control Act of 1965)
 River and Harbor Act of 1966, November 7, 1966 (Flood Control Act of 1966)
 River and Harbor Act of 1968 (Flood Control Act of 1968)
 River and Harbor Act of 1970, December 31, 1970 (Flood Control Act of 1970)
 Flood Control Act of 1972, March 7, 1974

See also
 Flood Control Act
 Rivers and Harbors Act
 Watershed Protection and Flood Prevention Act of 1954

United States federal defense and national security legislation
United States federal public land legislation
United States federal environmental legislation
Water law in the United States
Federal assistance in the United States